Mohammad-Reza Shafiei Kadkani (also Romanized as "Mohammad–Reza Shafi'i Kadkani") (born 10 October 1939) is an Iranian writer, poet, literary critic, editor, and translator.

Kadkani was born in Nishapur, Razavi Khorasan. 

He is currently professor of literature at Tehran University.  Shafiei-Kadkani is known for his works on literary criticism and modern Persian poetry.

Education

Kadkani did not attend formal primary and secondary education. His parents sent him to classical religious schools at an age when others were going to formal government-sponsored primary and secondary schools. In interviews, he has credited his command of Persian and Arabic literature to his classical training. 

He was spotted leafing through poetry books in a bookshop when a professor of literature noticed him -- and impressed by Kadkani's vast command of Persian poetry -- recommended that he formally pursue literature at the University of Mash-had.

Shafiei-Kadkani graduated from Tehran University with a doctorate degree in Persian literature. 

He was a student of prominent figures such as Badiozzaman Forouzanfar, Mohammad Moin, and Parviz Natel-Khanlari.

Books

Kadkani has written several books on the art of poetry, the first of which was completed in 1955, and published about 10 years later. Two of his most famous books are the following. 

 Poetry and Music
 Poetry and Imagination

Kadkani has also researched, edited and compiled several classical books of Persian poetry, including all major works of Attar. Kadkani dedicates some of these Attar volumes to his father. 

In 2018, Kadkani published a 3-volume treatise on the Persian poet Hafez. Two of these are based on his lectures at the University of Tehran. The third consists of a collection of his notes on Hafez' poetic lexicon. Kadkani credits his mother for having introduced him to Hafez and dedicates this 3-volume work to her.

Poems

He started publishing his poems in local publications at an early age while still living in the Khorasan province of Iran. 

Originally, he used the pen-name of "Sereshk", which in Persian can mean "tear". This pen-name was also based on the Persian abbreviation of his full name. 
His most famous poem -- Happy Journeys! -- has brought him international attention. It has decorated a wall in Leiden. It has also been inscribed on tombstones of many Persians, abroad and at home. (Use of poetry on tombstones is a long-standing tradition in the Persian-speaking world.)

See also

 Persian literature
 List of Persian poets and authors

References

External links

1939 births
Living people
Poets from Nishapur
20th-century Iranian historians
Iranian translators
Iranian literary critics
People related to Persian literature
Researchers of Persian literature
Faculty of Letters and Humanities of the University of Tehran alumni
Distinguished professors in Iran